Ait Saghrouchen (Berber: Ayt Seɣruccen) is a commune and a historical Berber tribe in the Taza Province of the Taza-Al Hoceima-Taounate administrative region of Morocco.

At the time of the 2004 census, the commune had a total population of 16362 people living in 2888 households.

References

Populated places in Taza Province
Rural communes of Fès-Meknès